Caravan to Midnight is the sixth studio album by Robin Trower. The album cover art is by Hipgnosis. It was reissued in 1997 as a 2-on-1 CD along with his next 1980 album Victims of the Fury.

Track listing
All tracks by James Dewar and Robin Trower except where noted.

Side one
"My Love (Burning Love)" – 3:17
"Caravan to Midnight" (Robin Trower) – 5:01
"I'm Out to Get You" – 5:24
"Lost in Love" – 4:27

Side two
"Fool" – 3:45
"It's for You" – 4:38
"Birthday Boy" – 3:51
"King of the Dance" – 3:10
"Sail On" – 4:02

Personnel 
 James Dewar – vocals
 Robin Trower – guitar
 Rustee Allen – bass
 Bill Lordan – drums
 Paulinho da Costa – percussion (tracks 1-3, 6, 8)
Technical
Pete Ellis Bishop - engineer
Chris Desmond, Ralph Osborn - assistant engineer
Hipgnosis - art direction
George Hardie - illustration, design

Charts

References

External links 
 Robin Trower - Caravan to Midnight (1978) album releases & credits at Discogs
 Robin Trower - Caravan to Midnight (1978) album to be listened on Spotify
 Robin Trower - Caravan to Midnight (1978) album to be listened on YouTube

1978 albums
Robin Trower albums
Albums with cover art by Hipgnosis
Chrysalis Records albums
albums recorded at Wally Heider Studios